The 2014 USA Pro Cycling Challenge was the fourth edition of the USA Pro Cycling Challenge stage race. Once again, the race was included on the UCI America Tour, with a UCI classification of 2.HC. As such, the race was only open to teams on the UCI ProTour, UCI Professional Continental and UCI Continental circuits. The race took place between August 18–24, 2014 as a seven-day, seven-stage race, traversing the state of Colorado. The 2014 USA Pro Cycling Challenge was one of six UCI-ranked stage races in the United States in 2014, and one of two (along with the 2014 Tour of California) that attracted multiple UCI ProTeams to compete.

Participating teams
In July, the USA Pro Cycling Challenge announced a sixteen-team field, made up of five UCI ProTeams, four UCI Professional Continental Teams and seven UCI Continental Teams, thus giving the race a total of sixteen-teams (the same as in 2013).

UCI ProTeams
 
 
 
 
 

UCI Professional Continental Teams
 
 
 
 

UCI Continental Teams

Stages

Results

Stage 1
August 18, 2014 — Aspen to Aspen, 

{|
|'''Stage 1 Results and General Classification after Stage 1

Stage 2
August 19, 2014 — Aspen to Crested Butte,

Stage 3
August 20, 2014 — Gunnison to Monarch Mountain,

Stage 4
August 21, 2014 — Colorado Springs to Colorado Springs,

Stage 5
August 22, 2014 — Woodland Park to Breckenridge,

Stage 6
August 23, 2014 — Vail, individual time trial (ITT)

Stage 7
August 24, 2014 — Boulder to Denver,

Classification leadership
In the USA Pro Cycling Challenge, five jerseys are awarded. For the general classification, calculated by adding the finishing times of the stages per cyclist, the leader receives a yellow jersey. This classification is considered the most important of the USA Pro Cycling Challenge, and the winner of the general classification will be considered the winner of the event.

Additionally, there is also a sprints classification, akin to what is called the points classification in other races, which awards a green jersey. Points are gathered at sprint line performances as well as finishing the stage in the top-fifteen places.

There is also a mountains classification, which awards a red jersey. In the mountains classifications, points are won by reaching the top of a mountain before other cyclists. Each climb is categorized, either first, second, third, or fourth category, with more points available for the harder climbs.

There is also a youth classification. This classification is calculated the same way as the general classification, but only young cyclists (under 23) are included. The leader of the young rider classification receives a blue jersey.

The last jersey is awarded to the most aggressive rider of a stage for him to wear on the next stage. It is generally awarded to a rider who attacks constantly or spends a lot of time in the breakaways. This jersey is orange.

There is also a classification for teams. In this classification, the times of the best three cyclists per stage are added, and the team with the lowest time is the leader.

References

External links

USA Pro Cycling Challenge
USA Pro Cycling Challenge
USA Pro Cycling Challenge
USA Pro Cycling Challenge